I Belong to the Zoo is a Filipino indie pop rock band. I Belong to the Zoo started as a solo folk project by Argee Guerrero. After the success of their debut studio album, Guerrero expended the project into a band with Simon Clariza and Lee De Veyra on guitars, Kristoff Medina on bass, and Ow Owyong on drums. The band has more than three hundred million total Spotify streams, averaging 1.2 million monthly listeners.

Associated acts of the band include Mayonnaise, Reese Lansangan, Moira Dela Torre, Gabba Santiago, Clara Benin, Paolo Tabuena of Runway Crimes, and Tonight We Sleep. Tabuena is a frequent collaborator of the band, and has directed the music video of their song "Paumanhin". Guerrero is also the vocalist and guitarist of the band Tonight We Sleep.

History

Performing solo, 2002–2007 
As a grade 7 student, Guerrero was exposed to live rock performances, which inspired him to pursue a career in music.

Guerrero began performing solo acoustic shows and using his own name, but found it challenging as he perceived the use of his own name as boastful. He then performed under the stage name Fireplace Letters. 

By 2007, Guerrero stopped performing solo and went on to form the band Tonight We Sleep.

Tonight We Sleep, 2007–present 
Guerrero, Ton Vergel de Dios (guitar), Rex Ferriols (bass) and Paolo Owyong (drums) formed the band Tonight We Sleep in 2007. Guerrero and Owyong served as songwriters for the band. They were managed by Mary Moon Productions.

I Belong to the Zoo, the solo project, 2014–2018 
In 2014, Guerrero started a solo musical career as he felt that some of the songs that he wrote are too mellow and emotional for Tonight We Sleep. Guerrero said that he incorporates his personal experience in the songs for I Belong to the Zoo, which is not the case for the songs he wrote for Tonight We Sleep.

The name I Belong to the Zoo came from a parody of Happy Birthday to You with the lyrics, “Happy birthday to you, I belong to the zoo” which Guerrero used to serenade his then-girlfriend. Guerrero further explained that the phrase described himself in a nutshell saying, "The name kind of just stuck [...] As a kid, I was teased for the way I look. ‘I belong to the zoo’ was my way of owning it.” 

In 2017, I Belong to the Zoo released its self-titled debut album.

I Belong to the Zoo, the band, 2018–present 
After the success of the first album, I Belong to the Zoo then expanded to a five-member band which now composed of Guerrero (vocals and guitar), Owyong (drums) , Simon Clariza (guitar), Lee De Veyra (guitar), and Kristoff Medina (bass).

After testing positive for COVID-19 in August 2020, Guerrero advised his fans to stay home and wear masks properly. He was able to recover within the same month. Along with the news of his recovery, he released a cover of Taking Back Sunday's "MakeDamnSure" with Tabuena and Paolo Owyong.

In 2021, the band released its second studio album, Kapiling.

Musical style and influences 
I Belong to the Zoo's music has been described as folk, indie rock,  and currently, pop rock. It was described as in the same musical territory of Keaton Henson, William Fitzsimmons, Dallas Green, and Damien Rice. Guerrero further explained that he listened to lots of Rice's music which became the main influence for I Belong to the Zoo. However, according to Guerrero, his music influences are mostly OPM rock bands such as Greyhoundz, Slapshock, and Quezo.

When it comes to songwriting, Guerrero cites Dashboard Confessional as a key influence, particularly how the vocalist Chris Carraba performed in their MTV Unplugged 2.0 live album.

Band members 

 Argee Guerrero – lead vocals, guitars
 Simon Clariza – guitars
 Lee De Veyra – guitars
 Kristoff Medina – bass
 Paolo "Ow" Owyong – drums

Discography

Albums 

I Belong to the Zoo (Self-released, 2017)
Kapiling (Self-released, 2021)

Singles

As lead artist

As featured artist

In other media 

In 2017, the songs "Porter", "Ruin" (with Reese Lansangan), and "Pity Party" appeared in  the TV5 series, Forever Sucks.

In 2019, "Sana" appeared in the film Open.

In 2021, the WeTV series Pasabuy used "Balang Araw", "In an Instant", and "Pansamantala".

Awards and nominations

Notes

References

External links 

 
 Cornerstone Entertainment

Filipino pop music groups
Musical groups from Quezon City
Filipino rock music groups